The name Vongfong has been used to name four tropical cyclones in the northwestern Pacific Ocean. The name was contributed by Macao and literally means "Wasp".

 Tropical Storm Vongfong (2002) (T0214, 20W)
 Tropical Storm Vongfong (2008) (T0811, 12W)
 Typhoon Vongfong (2014) (T1419, 19W, Ompong), a Category 5 super typhoon that struck Japan.
 Typhoon Vongfong (2020) (T2001, 01W, Ambo), a Category 3 typhoon that hit the Philippines, causing over ₱1 billion damage.
The name Vongfong was retired after the 2020 typhoon season; it was later replaced by Penha in the spring of 2022, and was contributed by Macao which named after Our Lady of Penha Chapel is located on the top of the hill and is listed in the Classical Immovable Properties.

Pacific typhoon set index articles